The following elections occurred in the year 1868.

North America

United States
 1868 New York state election
 1868 South Carolina gubernatorial election
 United States House of Representatives elections in California, 1868
 1868 and 1869 United States House of Representatives elections
 1868 United States presidential election
 1868 and 1869 United States Senate elections

Europe
 1868 Dutch general election
 1868 United Kingdom general election

South America
 1868 Argentine presidential election

Oceania
 First Māori elections

See also
 :Category:1868 elections

1868
Elections